= Rethinking Sorrow =

1991 book by Margaret Helen Childs

- Author: Margaret Helen Childs
- Publisher: University of Michigan Press
- Publication date: 1991
- Pages: 181
- ISBN: 0-939512-42-4

Rethinking Sorrow: Revelatory Tales of Late Medieval Japan is a 1991 book by Margaret Helen Childs.
